The Ajax was an American assembled 5 seat touring car automobile that never went beyond the prototypical stage.  It was to have a Continental 7-R six-cylinder engine with a  wheelbase, and had been slated to begin production in 1921.

Vintage vehicles
Defunct motor vehicle manufacturers of the United States